Bhit Ja Bhittai, is the popular Sindhi song which is sung by many Sindhi artist such as Jallal Chandio, Mai Bhagi, Sohrab Faqeer and others as well. Recently this song was presented in a new way by the Pakistani artist Shani Arshad. "Bhit ja Bhittai is not only the folk song but also the Kallam", Shani said. This song became very famous. initially the song was a 40-second track advertisement of Telenor, then after Shani decided to launch a full-length edition of the song.

References

Pakistani folk songs
Sindhi-language songs
Shah Abdul Latif Bhittai